The 1991 Men's Hockey Champions Trophy was the 13th edition of the Hockey Champions Trophy, an international men's field hockey tournament organized by the FIH. It took place from 12 to 22 September 1991 in the Olympiastadion in Berlin, Germany.

The hosts Germany won their fourth title by finishing first in the round-robin tournament.

Results

Pool

Statistics

Final standings

Goalscorers

References

External links
Official FIH website

Champions Trophy
Hockey Champions Trophy Men
Champions Trophy (field hockey)
International field hockey competitions hosted by Germany
Sports competitions in Berlin
Hockey Champions Trophy Men
Hockey Champions Trophy Men